Pervis Jackson (May 17, 1938 – August 18, 2008) was an American R&B singer, noted as the bass singer for The Spinners, and was one of the group's original members as well as their spokesman. His deep timbered voice and calm swagger garnered him a reputation around town and the industry.

Jackson was born in New Orleans, Louisiana, but moved with his family at a very young age to the city of Detroit. Jackson was perhaps best known for his line of "12:45" from the group's Billboard charting Top 10 hit "Games People Play", released in 1975.

Jackson was still a part of The Spinners up to his death from brain and liver cancer at the age of 70, in Detroit, Michigan, on August 18, 2008.

References

External links
The Spinners official site
Jackson's section of "Games People Play" via YouTube

1938 births
2008 deaths
Musicians from New Orleans
The Spinners (American group) members
Motown artists
Deaths from cancer in Michigan
20th-century African-American male singers